Henry Hirst (1838 – 14 December 1911) was a 19th-century Member of Parliament from Southland, New Zealand.

Private life
Hirst was born in 1838 in Huddersfield, Yorkshire, England. He received his education at Huddersfield College. He arrived at Port Chalmers in Otago on the Agra on 30 October 1858 and first settled in the Te Anau / Manapouri area in Southland. Together with John Watts-Russell of Christchurch, he explored Breaksea Sound for open land for sheep farming, but they were unsuccessful in this venture. Next, Hirst settled at Riverton where he had a butchery. In 1860, he married a daughter of William Dallas. In August 1861, he was the first who managed to drive cattle from Southland to the Gabriel's Gully gold field during the Otago Gold Rush. Some time later, Hirst was farming at Orepuki. When gold was discovered in the locality in 1866, the government resumed the land that he was farming, and he bought another property in the town where he lived for the rest of his life.

Political career

Hirst was elected onto Wallace County Council in 1877 and was its first chairman for eight years. He remained on the county council until his death.

Hirst was instrumental in having what became the Tuatapere Branch extended to Riverton.

Death
Hirst died on 14 December 1911 at Orepuki. He was survived by two sons and six daughters.

References

1838 births
1911 deaths
People from Southland, New Zealand
Members of the New Zealand House of Representatives
New Zealand MPs for South Island electorates
Unsuccessful candidates in the 1881 New Zealand general election
Unsuccessful candidates in the 1887 New Zealand general election
Unsuccessful candidates in the 1890 New Zealand general election
Unsuccessful candidates in the 1893 New Zealand general election
Unsuccessful candidates in the 1896 New Zealand general election
People from Huddersfield
19th-century New Zealand politicians
English emigrants to New Zealand
People educated at Huddersfield New College